KFGY (92.9 FM) is a commercial radio station licensed to Healdsburg, California, broadcasting to the Santa Rosa, California, area.

KFGY airs a country music format branded as "Froggy 92.9".

External links
Official Website

Country radio stations in the United States
Healdsburg, California
Mass media in Sonoma County, California
FGY
Radio stations established in 1979
1979 establishments in California